Tomas Aguon Camacho (September 18, 1933 – March 5, 2018) was the first Bishop of the Roman Catholic Diocese of Chalan Kanoa in the Northern Mariana Islands. He served for 25 years as bishop from 1985 until his retirement in 2010.

Biography
Camacho was born in Chalan Kanoa, Saipan, on September 18, 1933, to Vidal Palacios Camacho and Maria Aguon Camacho. He was ordained a Catholic priest on June 14, 1961, at the age of 27.

Camacho was appointed the first bishop of the newly created Roman Catholic Diocese of Chalan Kanoa on November 8, 1984, by Pope John Paul II. He was consecrated on January 13, 1985.

Camacho served as Bishop until his retirement on April 6, 2010, at the age of 76. Immediately after his retirement, he was named bishop emeritus of the diocese. He was eventually succeeded by Ryan Pagente Jimenez, who was ordained as the new bishop on August 14, 2016.

In February 2017, a lawsuit was filed against Camacho by a man claiming that he was sexual abused by the former Bishop between 1971 and 1974 when he was serving as a priest at the Nuestra Senora de las Aguas Catholic Church in Mongmong, Guam. In April 2019, a second filed a lawsuit against Camacho claiming that he was sexually abused by Camacho at the Mongmong church in the early 1962. The Archdiocese of Agaña, which previously had direct jurisdiction over not only Guam but  all of the other Mariana Islands as well, was also named as a co-defendant in the lawsuits as well.

Camacho died on Monday, March 5, 2018, at the Commonwealth Health Center, Garapan, on the island of Saipan at the age of 84.  He was honored by the local community, and buried on Tuesday, March 13, 2018 beneath the sanctuary of the Mount Carmel Cathedral in Saipan.

References

1933 births
2018 deaths
People from Saipan
Northern Mariana Islands Roman Catholic bishops
20th-century Roman Catholic bishops in the United States
21st-century Roman Catholic bishops in the United States
Roman Catholic bishops of Chalan Kanoa